Dhoorathu Pachai is a 1987 Indian Tamil-language film directed by Manobala, starring Karthik, Suhasini and Tulasi. It was released on 24 July 1987, after two years of delay.

Plot

Cast

Karthik
Suhasini
Tulasi
Goundamani
Manorama
Vadivukkarasi
V. K. Ramasamy

Production
The film began production under the title Endrum Nee and took two years to complete.

Soundtrack
The music was composed by Ilaiyaraaja.

Reception
The Indian Express wrote, "Thoorathu Pachai moves briskly but the climax is all mixed up".

References

External links
 

1980s Tamil-language films
1987 films
Films directed by Manobala
Films scored by Ilaiyaraaja